The Bay Isle Commercial Building is a historic site in Tampa, Florida, United States. It is located at 238 East Davis Boulevard. On August 3, 1989, it was added to the U.S. National Register of Historic Places.

References

External links

 Hillsborough County listings at National Register of Historic Places
 Florida's Office of Cultural and Historical Programs
 Hillsborough County listings
 Bay Isle Commercial Building

Buildings and structures in Tampa, Florida
National Register of Historic Places in Tampa, Florida
Mediterranean Revival architecture of Davis Islands, Tampa, Florida
1926 establishments in Florida